All of a Sudden is a 1996 Hong Kong crime mystery film directed by Herman Yau and starring Simon Yam and Irene Wan.

Plot
An erotic mystery about a widower who seeks revenge against the man who had an affair with the widower's wife before her apparent suicide. However, things soon turn complicated when the widower begins a relationship with the man's wife.

Cast and roles
 Simon Yam as Tsui Chin-tung
 Irene Wan as Lam Ho-yee
 Alfred Cheung as Lam Kwok-chiu
 Dayo Wong as Detective Guy Mak
 Peter Ngo as Bill Chan
 Tsang yin as Stella Tsui
 Lam Chiu-wing as Drunk driver
 Rico Chung as Driver in accident
 William Leung as Ming
 Lee Chi-kei as Solicitor Chan
 Joe Chu as Lam Kwok-choi's hired thug
 James Tsim
 Stephen Poon
 Kerrick Wong as Hard Rock Cafe staff
 Fong Yue as Sister Sam
 Wong Ka-on as Baby Lam
 Tam Wing-san as Uncle Wong
 Lo Hung as Security guard
 Mak On-luk as Policewoman

See also
 List of Hong Kong films

External links
 
 HK Cinemagic entry

1996 films
1996 crime thriller films
1990s psychological thriller films
1990s mystery thriller films
1990s erotic thriller films
Hong Kong crime thriller films
Hong Kong erotic films
1990s Cantonese-language films
Films directed by Herman Yau
Films set in Hong Kong
Films shot in Hong Kong
1990s Hong Kong films